Humboldt Peak is the southernmost high summit in the East Humboldt Range of Elko County in northeastern Nevada. To the west are First and Second Boulder Canyons, to the south is Pole Canyon and Secret Pass, and to the east is the South Fork of Steele Creek and Clover Valley. The summit is the end of a high crest running almost  to the north, and the beginning of a slow descent to Ruby Valley to the southeast. The mountain is in the East Humboldt Wilderness and Humboldt National Forest.

References

External links 
 

Mountains of Elko County, Nevada
East Humboldt Range
Mountains of Nevada
Humboldt–Toiyabe National Forest